This is a list of the people born in, residents of, or otherwise closely associated with the city of Terre Haute, Indiana, and its surrounding metropolitan area.

Actors and actresses
 Wally Bruner – actor, television personality
 Jose Pablo Cantillo – movies, television
 Benjamin Scatman Crothers – musician, movies, television
 Dorothy Dalton – theatre, movies
 Johnnie "Scat" Davis – musician, bandleader, movies
 Ross Ford – theater, movies
 Richard "Skeets" Gallagher – vaudeville, theatre, movies
 Jess Hahn – French movies
 Chubby Johnson – movies, television
 Grover Jones – screenwriter, producer, director, author
 Joe Keaton – vaudeville, movies; father of actor Buster Keaton
 Billy Lee – child film star
 Dave Madden – movies, television; The Partridge Family
 Rose Melville – actor, vaudeville, movies
 Alvy Moore – movies, television – Green Acres
 Maurice Ransford – motion pictures art director
 Ron Burgundy – anchorman
 Edward Roseman – vaudeville, movies
 Valeska Suratt – theater, silent movies, vaudeville
 Bill Thompson – voice actor, Fibber McGee and Molly
 Jerry Van Dyke – television, movies
 Stuart Vaughn – actor, award-winning director, Obie Award, Drama Desk Award
 Hunter von Leer – movies

Artists
 Mick Mars - Motley Crew 
 Amalia Küssner Coudert – miniaturist
 John Rogers Cox – painter
 Ray H. French – printmaker
 John "Dok" Hager – cartoonist
 Harriet Goodhue Hosmer – sculptor
 Bryan Hunt – sculptor
 Edith Pfau – painter, sculptor, art educator
 Janet Scudder – sculptor
 D. Omer Seamon – painter
 Gilbert Brown Wilson – artist, muralist, motion pictures

Athletes
 Vic Aldridge – baseball
 Ray Arcel – boxing trainer, International Boxing Hall of Fame
 Clint Barmes – baseball
 Armon Bassett – basketball player with Ironi Ramat Gan of Israel
 Bruce Baumgartner – wrestling, James E. Sullivan Award winner, U.S. Olympic gold medalist
 Greg Bell – track and field; U.S. Olympic gold medalist
 Shakir Bell – college and CFL football
 Junius Bibbs – African-American college football and baseball player; professional baseball player in the Negro leagues 
 Larry Bird – basketball player, coach, NBA executive
 Mordecai Brown – baseball, National Baseball Hall of Fame
 Cheryl Bridges – cross country and track; held the World Record in the marathon and US records in 3 mile and 5,000 meter
 Bill Butland – baseball
 Cam Cameron – football, college and NFL football coach
 Max Carey – baseball, National Baseball Hall of Fame
 Barry Collier – basketball coach, athletic administrator
 Bruce Connatser – professional baseball
 Roger Counsil – swimmer, gymnastics coach
 Glenn M. Curtis – high school, college and pro basketball coach
 Josh Devore – baseball
 Terry Dischinger – basketball, U.S. Olympic gold medalist
 Brian Dorsett – baseball
 Jim Jumbo Elliott – baseball
 Danny Etling – football
 Brian Evans – basketball
 Bud Fowler – baseball
 Tiger Jack Fox – boxing
 Rufus Gilbert – baseball, coach
 Vencie Glenn – football
 Alex Graman – baseball
 Scott Haffner – basketball
 Frank Hamblen – basketball, NBA coach
 Russ Hathaway – football
 John Hazen – basketball
 Rick Heller – college baseball coach
 Aubrey Herring – track, hurdles, NCAA champion
 Eddie Hickey – basketball coach, Basketball Hall of Fame
 Bill Hodges – basketball coach
 Paul Humphrey – football
 Tunch Ilkin – college and NFL football
 Mark Jackson – football
 Tommy John – baseball
 Neil Johnston – baseball, basketball, Basketball Hall of Fame
 Doug Kay – football coach
 Bob King – basketball coach, administrator
 Duane Klueh – basketball, tennis, player, coach
 Greg Lansing – basketball coach
 Don Lash – Olympic track, Sullivan Award winner   
 Danny Lazar – baseball
 Bob Slick Leonard – basketball, ABA and NBA coach, Basketball Hall of Fame
 Bryan Leturgez – track and field, Olympic bobsled
 Clyde Lovellette – basketball, U.S. Olympic gold medalist, Basketball Hall of Fame
 Curt Mallory – football, college coach 
 Johnny Mann – baseball
 Walter E. Marks – athlete, athletic administrator Indiana State University
 Thad Matta – college basketball coach
 Tony McGee – football tight end
 Dave McGinnis – football, college and NFL coach
 Kevin McKenna – basketball, player, coach
 Trent Miles – football coach
 Rick Minter – football coach
 Erica Moore – track & field
 Paul Moss – two-time college All-American, NFL
 Albert "Cod" Myers – baseball
 Nancy Hanks – harness racing
 Art Nehf – baseball, pitched in four World Series
 Bill Nelson – baseball
 Steve Newton – basketball, player, coach
 Carl Nicks – basketball
 Greg Oden – basketball
 Jake Odum – basketball
 Brian Omogrosso – baseball
 Jake Petricka – baseball
 Jamie Petrowski – football
 Josh Phegley – baseball
 Dennis Raetz – football, player, coach
 Kurt Rambis – basketball, player, coach
 Rick Ray (basketball) – coach
 Colin Rea – baseball
 A. J. Reed – baseball player
 Cheryl Reeve – basketball coach, WNBA
 Mike Sanford – college football coach
 Dave Schellhase – basketball, player, coach
 Ed Seward – "Kid" Seward, baseball
 Dexter Shouse – basketball
 Zane Smith – baseball
 Gordon B. Stauffer – basketball coach
 Mitch Stetter – baseball
 Ace Stewart – baseball
 Ryan Strausborger – baseball
 Jerry Sturm – football
 Charles Bernard Bud Taylor – boxer, bantamweight champion, International Boxing Hall of Fame
 Harry Taylor – baseball
 Joe Thatcher – baseball
 Debi Thomas – world champion figure skater
 Kurt Thomas – gymnast, James E. Sullivan Award winner
 Anthony Thompson – football player
 Lyle Bud Tinning – baseball
 Paul Dizzy Trout – baseball
 Robert Bobby Turner – college and NFL player and coach
 Royce Waltman – college basketball coach
 Bob Warn – college baseball coach
 Steve Weatherford – football
 Mike Westhoff – college and NFL football coach
 John Wooden – basketball, Basketball Hall of Fame

Military
 Charles G. Abrell – Medal of Honor, Korean War
 George W. Biegler – Medal of Honor, Philippine–American War
 Charles Cruft – teacher, newspaper publisher, lawyer, Union Civil War general
 William Henry Harrison – Governor Indiana Territory, commander of Fort Harrison, President of the United States
 Nick Popaditch – Gunnery Sergeant, USMC, Gulf War, Iraq War
 Peter J. Ryan – Medal of Honor, Civil War
 Josiah Snelling – military leader, commander of Fort Harrison
 John T. Sterling – Medal of Honor, Civil War
 William Maxwell Wood – naval surgeon, first Surgeon General

Musicians
 Leo Baxter – musician, composer, band director
 Steven Caldwell – musician, folk singer
 Johnnie "Scat" Davis – singer, bandleader
 Paul Dresser – vaudeville actor, composer, "On The Banks of the Wabash, Far Away," "My Gal Sal"
 Edwin Franko Goldman – bandleader, composer
 Indiana Gregg – singer, songwriter
 Mick Mars – born Robert Alan Deal; Mötley Crüe guitarist
 Hank Roberts – jazz cellist, vocalist
 Claude Thornhill – pianist, arranger, bandleader, composer

Politicians
 Simon Bamberger – governor of Utah
 Birch Bayh – U.S. Senator
 Evan Bayh – governor of Indiana and U.S. Senator
 Thomas H. Blake – U.S. Congressman, Commissioner of the U.S. Land Office, resident trustee of Wabash and Erie Canal
 Newton Booth – governor of California, U.S. Senator
 James Bopp – conservative attorney known for Citizens United v. FEC; Republican National Committeeman
 Joseph Gurney Cannon – Speaker of the United States House of Representatives
 P. Pete Chalos – four-term mayor of Terre Haute
 John G. Davis – U.S. Congressman
 John Wesley Davis – physician, Speaker of the United States House of Representatives, governor of the Oregon Territory
 Eugene Victor Debs (1855–1926) – Socialist candidate for president
 Joseph V. Graff – U.S. Congressman
 Abram A. Hammond – lieutenant governor of Indiana, governor of Indiana
 Edward A. Hannegan – U.S. Congressman, U.S. Senator, diplomat
 Russell Benjamin Harrison – son of President Benjamin Harrison
 William H. Harrison – five-term U.S. Congressman
 Nicholas Hood – Detroit City Council member and Congregationalist minister
 Elisha Mills Huntington – attorney, federal judge, Commissioner of U.S. Land Office
 Virginia E. Jenckes – first U.S. Congresswoman from Indiana
 Brian Kerns – Republican Congressman
 John Edward Lamb – Congressman, political leader
 William Carr Lane – military surgeon, mayor St. Louis, governor New Mexico Territory
 Dick Thompson Morgan – author, U.S. Congressman
 John H. O'Neall – U.S. Congressman
 P.B.S. Pinchback – politician, governor of Louisiana
 Edward James Roye – merchant, president of Liberia
 Everett Sanders – U.S. Congressman, secretary to President Calvin Coolidge, chairman of the Republican National Committee
 John Gould Stephenson – fifth Librarian of Congress
 Richard Wigginton Thompson – U.S. Congressman and Secretary of the Navy under President Rutherford B. Hayes
 Ralph Tucker – five-term mayor of Terre Haute
 John Palmer Usher – Indiana Attorney General, Secretary of Interior under President Abraham Lincoln
 Daniel Wolsey Voorhees – U.S. Congressman, U.S. Senator
 Fred Wampler – U.S. Congressman
 James Whitcomb – Commissioner of U.S. Land Office, governor of Indiana, U.S. Senator

Scientists and engineers
 Willis Blatchley – scientist, naturalist
 H. R. Cox (Herald Rea Cox) – bacteriologist
 Ernest R. Davidson – chemist, educator, National Medal of Science recipient
 David Deming – scientist, author, professor at the University of Oklahoma
 Lee Alvin DuBridge – educator, physicist, college administrator
 Barton Warren Evermann – biologist
 Thomas Lomar Gray – educator, engineer, college administrator
 Sam Hulbert – educator, scientist, inventor
 James Arthur Lovell, Jr. – astronaut
 William R. McKeen, Jr. – engineer, inventor of the McKeen railmotor and McKeen Car; founder of the McKeen Motor Car Company
 Thomas Corwin Mendenhall – physicist
 William A. Noyes – chemist, educator, recipient of Priestley Medal and Gibbs Medal
 John Adelbert Parkhurst – astronomer
 William Wesley Peters – architect, structural engineer
 Abe Silverstein – engineer, space aerodynamicist
 Jill Bolte Taylor – "The Singing Scientist," neuroanatomist, author
 Edward Tryon – astrophysicist, cosmologist
 Robert Tryon – engineering fatigue analyst

Writers
 Lyman Abbott – minister, magazine publisher and editor
 Claude Bowers – journalist, author, diplomat
 Troy Brownfield – journalist, comic book writer, author, Prince Dracula
 Winnifred Harper Cooley – author, journalist
 Helen Corey – Syrian-American cookbook author, The Art of Syrian Cookery (1962) and Food from Biblical Lands (1989)
 George W. Cutter – The Song of Steam, Buena Vista
 Theodore Dreiser – An American Tragedy
 Max Ehrmann – A Prayer, Desiderata
 Philip Jose Farmer – science fiction author
 Robert Greenleaf – author
 Ida Husted Harper – suffragist, newspaper editor, History of Woman Suffrage, The Life and Work of Susan B. Anthony
 John Jakes – Kent Family Chronicles
 Howard Andrew Jones - American speculative fiction and fantasy author and editor
 William Harrison Mace – educator, historian, author, Lincoln, The Man of the People
 Edward J. Meeman – journalist and environmentalist
 Terry Pettus – journalist
 Susie Lankford Shorter – wrote Heroines of African Methodism (1891)
 Virginia Sorensen – winner of 1957 Newbery Medal
 William Strunk, Jr. – educator, author, "The Elements of Style"
 Martina Swafford — poet
 Agness Underwood – first female city editor of a metropolitan daily
 Will Weng – author, crossword puzzles editor New York Times

Others
 Saint Mother Theodore Guerin – educator, religious leader
 Eva Mozes Kor – Holocaust survivor, founder of CANDLES Holocaust Museum
 Robert Hayes Gore – newspaper executive, author, former Governor of Puerto Rico
 Matt Branam – late college president of Rose-Hulman Institute of Technology
 Ellen Church Marshall – first airline stewardess
 Horace G. Burt – president, Union Pacific Railroad
 Ray S. Cline – CIA, author
 Lotus Coffman – educator, college administrator
 W.C. Coup – circus magnate
 Hubert L. Dreyfus – philosopher, educator, author
 Stuart Dreyfus – educator, author
 Mari Hulman George – philanthropist
 Tony George – business executive, former president of the Indianapolis Motor Speedway
 Robert K. Greenleaf – business executive, author, educator
 William King Harvey – CIA, "America's James Bond"
 Anton Tony Hulman – industrialist, philanthropist; Indianapolis Motor Speedway
 Mary Fendrich Hulman – business executive, philanthropist
 Robert Hunter – social reformer, author, golf course architect
 Martin David Jenkins – educator, late college president of Morgan State University
 Robert Jerry – dean, University of Florida Levin College of Law
 William G. Kerckhoff – business executive, developer of Beverly Hills, California
 Abraham Markle – miller, Canadian legislator, soldier, village proprietor
 Edison E. Oberholtzer – educator, founder of the University of Houston
 Frank Popoff – business executive, current president of Dow Chemical and Chemical Financial Corp.
 Wanda Ramey – pioneer broadcast journalist
 Orville Redenbacher – popcorn entrepreneur; born in Brazil, Indiana; Vigo County farm agent
 Peter Riedel – pilot, gliding champion
 Chauncey Rose – railroad baron, philanthropist
 Lou Anna Simon – current college president Michigan State University
 William Truesdale – railroad executive
 Clarence Abiathar Waldo – educator, author
 Leroy A. Wilson – business executive, former president of AT&T
 William Winter – explorer, author

References

Terre Haute, Indiana
Terre Haute